Events from the year 1835 in art.

Events
June 6 – Augustus Welby Northmore Pugin is received into the Roman Catholic Church.
June – Caspar David Friedrich suffers his first stroke, which restricts his ability to paint in oils.
August – H. Fox Talbot exposes the world's first known photographic negatives at Lacock Abbey in England.
Victor Cousin introduces the expression "L'art pour l'art" ("Art for art's sake").
Marie Tussaud establishes the first permanent Madame Tussauds wax museum in London.

Publications
George Field – Chromatography; or, a Treatise on Colours and Pigments, and of their Powers in Painting.

Works

Théodore Chassériau
Aline Chassériau
Self-portrait
Léon Cogniet – The Egyptian Expedition Under the Command of Bonaparte (ceiling at Musée du Louvre, Paris)
John Constable – The Valley Farm
Jean-Baptiste-Camille Corot
Hagar in the Desert
Venise, La Piazetta
William Etty – Preparing for a Fancy Dress Ball
Caspar David Friedrich
The Giant Mountains
The Stages of Life
Willow Bush under a Setting Sun
Christen Købke
Frederiksborg Palace in the Evening Light
One of the Small Towers on Frederiksborg Castle
Roof Ridge of Frederiksborg Castle
John Linnell – Christ's Appearance to the Two Disciples Journeying to Emmaus
James Arthur O'Connor – The Poachers
John Orlando Parry – The Poster Man
Ary Scheffer – Francesca da Rimini and Paolo Malatesta appraised by Dante and Virgil (original version)
J. M. W. Turner
The Bright-Stone of Honour (Ehrenbreitstein) and Tomb of Marceau, from Byron's "Childe Harold"
The Burning of the Houses of Lords and Commons, 16th October, 1834
Ferdinand Georg Waldmüller – Wolfgangsee
David Wilkie – Columbus in the Convent at La Rabida

Births
January 3 – Fanny Cornforth, born Sarah Cox, English artists' model (died 1909)
March 31 – John La Farge, American painter and stained-glass artist (died 1910)
May 11 – Stefano Bruzzi, Italian painter (died 1911)
June 15 – Adah Isaacs Menken, American actress, painter and poet (died 1868)
June 23 – Fanny Eaton, Jamaican-born artists' model (died 1924)
July 2 – George Dunlop Leslie, English genre painter (died 1921)
December 9 – Raffaele Belliazzi, Italian sculptor (died 1917)
date unknown – Stanisław Chlebowski, Polish painter especially of oriental themes (died 1884)

Deaths
 February 13 – Jean-Baptiste Roman, French sculptor (born 1792)
 March 20 – Louis Léopold Robert, Swiss painter (born 1794)
 April 1 – Bartolomeo Pinelli, Italian illustrator and engraver (born 1771)
 April 4 – Friedrich August von Klinkowström, German artist, author and teacher (born 1778)
 April 5 – Ivan Martos, Russian-Ukrainian sculptor and art teacher (born 1754)
 May 1 – Elkanah Tisdale, American engraver, miniature painter and cartoonist (born 1768)
 May 15 – Pauline Auzou, French painter (born 1775)
 June 21 – Jan Rustem, Turkish-born portrait painter (born 1762)
 June 25 – Antoine-Jean Gros, French painter (born 1771)
 August 20 – Friedrich Rehberg, German portrait and historical painter (born 1758)
 October 23 – Thomas Heaphy, English watercolour and portrait painter (born 1775)
 November 3 – Giacomo Guardi, Italian veduta painter (born 1764)
 November 17 – Carle Vernet, French painter (born 1758)
 December 1 – Charles Hayter, English painter (born 1761)
 December 2 – James Fittler, English engraver (born 1758)

References

 
Years of the 19th century in art
1830s in art